News from the Front is an album by guitarist Marc Ducret which was recorded in 1991 and released on the JMT label.

Reception
The AllMusic review by Thom Jurek states "This is provocative music to be sure, but it is refined and restrained, elegant even". The Penguin Guide to Jazz Recordings describes it as “strikingly original and probably his best record.”

Track listing
All compositions by Marc Ducret except as indicated
 "Pour Agnes" - 3:44   
 "Can I Call You Wren?" - 6:30   
 "News from the Front" - 8:33   
 "Fanfare" - 9:39   
 "Wren Is Such a Strange Name" - 8:52   
 "Silver Rain" (Jean-Michel Pilc) - 3:20   
 "Golden Wren" - 8:19

Personnel
Marc Ducret - electric and acoustic 6 + 12 string guitars, fretless guitar
Herb Robertson - trumpet, flugelhorn
Yves Robert - trombone
François Verly - percussion, drum machine

References 

1992 albums
Marc Ducret albums
JMT Records albums
Winter & Winter Records albums